The northern New Guinea blind snake (Anilios erycinus) is a species of snake in the Typhlopidae family.

References

Anilios
Reptiles described in 1901